Hendrik Carré the Younger (1696–1775), was an 18th-century painter from the Northern Netherlands.

Biography
He was born in The Hague as the son of Hendrik Carré. He became a member of the Confrerie Pictura in 1719.
He was the younger brother of Abraham and the older brother of Johannes, and is known for miniatures, wall decorations, grisailles, and stage decorations for the French theatre of the Hague. He died in The Hague.

Works
His grisaille oil painting Hulde aan Pomona (Homage to Pomona) is in the collection of the Rijksmuseum, Netherlands.

References

Hendrik Carré the Younger on Artnet

1696 births
1775 deaths
18th-century Dutch painters
18th-century Dutch male artists
Dutch male painters
Artists from The Hague
Painters from The Hague